merritt k, formerly Merritt Kopas, is a Canadian video game designer and developer, as well as an author and a zine creator.

k is best known for her games LIM, HUGPUNX, and Consensual Torture Simulator. She said that the theme of her games is "the capacity of digital games to convey care relationships; either to provide a sense of care to the player or to invest her in the project of caring for another." She is also the author of Internet fiction and zines such as Dear Pauline and These Were Free on my Blog.

k is the editor of the Twine game print anthology Videogames for Humans and co-author of the poetry collection Total Mood Killer and the comics-poetry hybrid text Internet Murder Revenge Fantasy.

Career
k was raised on games and the Choose Your Own Adventure book series. In 2012, she was inspired by games made with the interactive fiction tool Twine, and has made several games with the software since. LIM was released for free on the internet and is about trying to meet society's expectations. Her book, Videogames for Humans, was described by VICE Motherboard as "a 'historical document' that not only features games, but also the experiences of play that specific people have had with a game itself."

k greatly credits Anna Anthropy and her publication of Rise of the Videogame Zinesters in 2012 as having a great influence on the indie gaming scene. Her game (ASMR) Vin Diesel DMing a Game of D&D Just For You has been described as "an example of games as caregiving".

On her personal website, k has published such games as Minkomora, Obeissance, and Take Care – the last one described as a game in which the player reaches through the ether to offer comfort to a distressed person. Some of her smaller pieces, such a Texture Piece-style game called Super Consent, deal with the complexities of issues like consent and why and how they should be dealt with in culture.

In September 2016, the NYU Game Center announced k as their first-ever artist in residence.

(ASMR) Vin Diesel DMing a Game of D&D Just For You
(ASMR) Vin Diesel DMing a Game of D&D Just For You was designed by k in 2015. The Twine game features American actor Vin Diesel providing a "quick game" of the fantasy tabletop role-playing game Dungeons & Dragons to help the player feel better about themself. Diesel is also a big fan of D&D. The game involves pictures of the actor as well as text introducing the game to the player. The autonomous sensory meridian response (ASMR) aspect of the game is in the gameplay rather than as audio.

Podcasts
k hosts her own podcast called Woodland Secrets, where she interviews primarily women, people of color, and queer people. On June 19, 2016, she began hosting Dadfeelings, a podcast about fictional dads and the feelings associated with them. k also guest starred on the Polygon podcast CoolGames Inc. for an episode. She is currently the primary host of Fanbyte's flagship podcast Channel F.

Games
 TERF War – July 2012
 LIM – August 2012
 Princess Queen – September 2012
 Brace – October 2012
 A Synchronous Ritual – October 2012
 Queer Pirate Plane – December 2012
 Bubblegum Slaughter – January 2013
 Octopy – March 2013
 Hugpunx – June 2013
 Consensual Torture Simulator – October 2013
 Take Care – October 2014

References

External links

Dadfeelings podcast

Living people
Year of birth missing (living people)
American video game designers
Women video game designers
Women video game developers
21st-century Canadian LGBT people
Canadian video game designers